Many lists of trees of Great Britain and Ireland have been written.  There are a number of issues surrounding the inclusion of a species in such a list. As can be seen from the outline of debate below, there is no 'correct' list of trees of Britain and Ireland.

Issues of debate

Definition of species
There are a number of different opinions regarding the validity of some species, notably apomictic microspecies and whether some 'species' may actually be hybrids. In particular, the number and definition of species in the genera Sorbus (rowans, whitebeams etc.), Ulmus (elms) and Salix (willows) are open to debate.

Definition of native
Native species are considered to be species which are today present in the region in question, and have been continuously present in that region since a certain period of time. When applied to Britain and Ireland, three possible definitions of this time constraint are:
 a species that colonised these islands during the retreat of ice at the end of the last ice age
 a species that was present in these islands when the English Channel was created and the land bridge between Britain and continental Europe was flooded
 a species that has colonised without human assistance; in some cases this is uncertain.

The only endemic tree species in Britain and Ireland (that is, that are native only to this region) are some apomictic whitebeams.

Species that were native in the region in prehistory before the last ice age, but not subsequently, are generally regarded as extinct and no longer native.

Many additional species have been imported by humans; the total list of all introduced trees numbers several thousand. A far smaller number of these have become widely naturalised, spreading by their own accord without recourse to further human assistance.

Definition of tree
A tree can be defined as a large, perennial, woody plant with secondary branches supported by a primary stem (compare with shrub). There is no set definition regarding minimum size, though most authors cite a tree species as being one which regularly reaches 6 m (20 ft) tall (see also tree).

List of species

Native trees

 Alders
 Alder (Alnus glutinosa)
 Apples
 Crab Apple (Malus sylvestris)
 Ashes
 Common Ash (Fraxinus excelsior)
 Beeches
European Beech (Fagus sylvatica)
 Birches
 Silver Birch (Betula pendula)
 Downy Birch (Betula pubescens)
 Box
Box (Buxus sempervirens)
 Cherries and Plums
 Wild Cherry (Prunus avium)
 Bird Cherry (Prunus padus)
 Blackthorn (Prunus spinosa)
 Elms
 Wych Elm (Ulmus glabra)
 Smooth-leaved Elm (Ulmus minor, syn. U. carpinifolia; southern Great Britain only)
 Hawthorns
 Common Hawthorn (Crataegus monogyna)
 Midland Hawthorn (Crataegus laevigata; southern Great Britain only)
Crataegus × media - occurs as a natural hybrid wherever monogyna and laevigata overlap.
 Hazels
 Common Hazel (Corylus avellana)
 Hollies
 European Holly (Ilex aquifolium)
 Hornbeams
 European Hornbeam (Carpinus betulus; southern Great Britain only)
 Junipers
 Common Juniper (Juniperus communis)
 Lindens (Limes)
Small-leaved Linden/Lime (Tilia cordata)
 Large-leaved Linden/Lime (Tilia platyphyllos; southern Great Britain only)
 Maples
Field Maple (Acer campestre)
 Oaks
 Pedunculate Oak (Quercus robur)
 Sessile Oak (Quercus petraea)
 Pines
 Scots Pine (Pinus sylvestris)
 Poplars
 Aspen (Populus tremula)
 Black Poplar (Populus nigra; southern Great Britain only)
 Rowans and Whitebeams
 European Rowan (Sorbus aucuparia)
 Common Whitebeam (Sorbus aria) and several related apomictic microspecies
 Service Tree (Sorbus domestica; recently discovered growing wild on a cliff in south Wales)
 Wild Service Tree (Sorbus torminalis)
 Strawberry Tree
 Strawberry Tree (Arbutus unedo; Ireland only)
 Willows (Salix spp.; several species)
 Bay Willow (Salix pentandra)
 Crack Willow (Salix fragilis)
 White Willow (Salix alba)
 Almond-leaved Willow (Salix triandra)
 Yews
 European Yew (Taxus baccata)

Native large shrubs
These larger shrubs occasionally reach tree size:
 Alder Buckthorn (Frangula alnus)
 Purging Buckthorn (Rhamnus cathartica)
 Elder (Sambucus nigra)
 Common Dogwood (Cornus sanguinea)
 Rock Whitebeam (Sorbus rupicola)
 (Common) Sea-buckthorn (Hippophae rhamnoides)
 Spindle (Euonymus europaeus)
 Sallow, Goat Willow (Salix caprea)
 Grey Willow (Salix cinerea)
 Purple Willow (Salix purpurea)
 Common Osier (Salix viminalis)
 Eared Willow (Salix aurita)
 Guelder Rose (Viburnum opulus)
 Wayfaring tree (Viburnum lantana)
 Common Privet (Ligustrum vulgare)

Naturalised trees
 From Europe
 Maritime Pine (Pinus pinaster; rarely)
 European Black Pine (Pinus nigra; rarely)
 Norway Spruce (Picea abies; rarely)
 European Larch (Larix decidua)
 European Pear (Pyrus communis; sometimes regarded as native)
 Plymouth Pear (Pyrus cordata; sometimes regarded as native)
 Cherry Plum (Prunus cerasifera)
 Sycamore (Acer pseudoplatanus)
 Norway Maple (Acer platanoides)
 Sweet Chestnut (Castanea sativa; a Roman introduction)
 Swedish Whitebeam (Sorbus intermedia)
 Holm Oak (Quercus ilex)
 Turkey Oak (Quercus cerris)
 Common Horse-chestnut (Aesculus hippocastanum)
 English Elm (Ulmus procera; a Roman introduction)
 From Asia
 Japanese Larch (Larix kaempferi)
 From North America
 Lodgepole Pine (Pinus contorta)
 Sitka Spruce (Picea sitchensis)
 Black Spruce (Picea mariana; rarely)
 Douglas-fir (Pseudotsuga menziesii)
 Grand Fir (Abies grandis)
 Western Hemlock (Tsuga heterophylla)
 Western Redcedar (Thuja plicata)
 Lawson's Cypress (Chamaecyparis lawsoniana)
 Monterey Cypress (Cupressus macrocarpa; rarely)
 From Oceania
 Cabbage palm (Cordyline australis)

Endemic species

An endemic species is a plant only native to a certain area. Outside this area, unless spread naturally it is considered non-native, usually as a result of cultivation.
Britain and Ireland have few endemic trees, most being micro-species of Whitebeam. But there are some interesting endemic trees nevertheless.

Plot's Elm – English Midlands only.
  Apomictic Whitebeams endemic to the British Isles:
Sorbus arranensis – Isle of Arran only.
Arran Service Tree – Isle of Arran only.
Sorbus pseudomeinichii - Isle of Arran only.
Lancashire Whitebeam - North Lancashire & South Cumbria, around Morecambe Bay only.
English Whitebeam - Great Britain and Ireland only.  
Bristol Whitebeam - Avon Gorge only.  
Devon Whitebeam – Devon, Somerset, Cornwall and Ireland only.
Ley’s Whitebeam – Brecon Beacons only.
Lesser Whitebeam – Brecon Beacons only.   
Sorbus leptophylla – endemic to UK 
Sorbus arvonensis - endemic to the Menai Strait region of North Wales.
Sorbus wilmottiana – endemic to UK  
Bloody Whitebeam – Exmoor only.  
Somerset Whitebeam – coastal North Devon and Western Somerset only.  
Cheddar Whitebeam – Cheddar Gorge only.  
“No Parking” Whitebeam – North Devon only.  
Llangollen Whitebeam – Llangollen only.  
Irish Whitebeam – Ireland only.  
Leigh Woods Whitebeam, Leigh Woods only.

See also
 Trees of the world
 Woodland management
 Coppicing
 Pollarding
 Forestry in the United Kingdom
 British National Vegetation Classification
List of forests in Ireland
List of forests in the United Kingdom
Coillte

References

External links

The Woodland Trust (UK conservation charity promoting woodland restoration and expansion.)
Forestry Commission (UK government department responsible for protection and expansion of Britain's forests and woodlands.) 
Elwes, Henry John, and Henry, Augustine, 1906 The trees of Great Britain & Ireland BHL Monograph.Includes rare introduced trees.Seven volumes and seven volumes of excellent black and white plates.
Tree Council of Ireland Heritage trees

Flora of Ireland
Flora of Great Britain
Trees of Britain and Ireland
Britain and Ireland